Sunmachine can refer to:

 Sunmachine (album), a 1998 album by Dario G.
 "Sunmachine" (song), a 1998 song from that album.
 "The Sun Machine", a 1990 song by E-Zee Possee.